Barrientosiimonas marina is a Gram-positive, non-spore-forming, aerobic and non-motile bacterium from the genus Barrientosiimonas which has been isolated from seawater from the Mara Island in Korea.

References

 

Micrococcales
Bacteria described in 2013